Aleksandr Yevgenyevich Krikunenko (born 3 August 1998) is a Russian football player. He plays for FC Salyut Belgorod.

Club career
He made his debut in the Russian Football National League for FC Irtysh Omsk on 1 August 2020 in a game against FC Yenisey Krasnoyarsk, as a starter.

References

External links
 
 Profile by Russian Football National League
 

1998 births
Sportspeople from Voronezh Oblast
People from Novousmansky District
Living people
Russian people of Ukrainian descent
Russian footballers
Association football defenders
FC Khimik-Arsenal players
FC Arsenal Tula players
FC Irtysh Omsk players
FC SKA Rostov-on-Don players
FC Salyut Belgorod players